Aeropostal Alas de Venezuela C.A. is a state-owned airline of Venezuela based in Torre Polar Oeste in Caracas, Venezuela. It operates domestic services and international services in the Caribbean. Its main base is Simón Bolívar International Airport. The airline ceased operations on September 24, 2017, after 88 years of service due to its financial position. On August 8, 2018, the company announced that it would begin scheduled service again, first to Havana, Cuba with three weekly flights.

History

Early history
Venezuela was one of the first South American nations to resort to commercial aviation as an effective means of transportation. In 1929, the French company Aéropostale (known as Lignes Aériennes Latécoère until 1927), then under the leadership of its owner Marcel Bouilloux-Lafont, arrived in Venezuela. Aéropostale viewed Venezuela as the ideal bridge to link South America with the Caribbean islands of Guadeloupe and Martinique. This idea materialized on July 3, 1929. Three Latécoère 28's carried out the first flights of the new airline, although some Latécoère 26's were also used in those earlier routes. On December 31, 1933, the Venezuelan government purchased the airline after the French government inexplicably decided to stop subsidizing it.

Life as a government-owned company

Despite its new Venezuelan ownership, the airline continued to be run by French personnel under the direction of Robert Guérin until January 1, 1935, when its name was changed to LAV - Línea Aeropostal Venezolana and operations shifted to Venezuelan hands under the management of commander Francisco Leonardi. At the start, the company was capitalized at 1,600,000 bolívares, but it wasn't until May 21, 1937, that the government of Venezuela secured full ownership of the airline. It did so through an injection of capital and by replacing the Latécoère 28's with several Fairchild 71's. The expansion program was further reinforced with the purchase of six Lockheed Model 10 Electras. In 1939, LAV's headquarters were moved from Maracay to Maiquetía because of its proximity to Caracas. That same year, Douglas DC-3s were introduced in order to transport larger cargo loads and passengers. By 1942 the fleet had grown considerably. LAV's first international flights began in July 1945, serving the city of Boa Vista in northern Brazil. It wasn't really considered an international destination as it was close to Venezuela's border. LAV's second international route was to Aruba in January 1946. This connected to KLM's international route structure.

After the war ended, LAV re-equipped with newer aircraft, replacing its Electra and Lockheed Lodestar fleet which was decimated by many accidents over the previous five years. Douglas DC-3s and Douglas DC-4s were introduced along with Martin 2-0-2 aircraft. In 1947, the airline introduced Lockheed Constellations to fly a new direct international route from Caracas to New York's Idlewild Airport. This new service started on March 21, 1947.

In 1951, LAV began service to Lima, Peru and Bogotá, Colombia. The Bogotá route was acquired by LAV after they purchased 88% of TACA de Venezuela. Previously, TACA de Venezuela had a joint route agreement with the Colombian airline, LANSA. Until TACA de Venezuela was completely absorbed by LAV in 1958, the route to Bogotá was flown using TACA aircraft in TACA livery. In 1953, LAV opened a transatlantic service and began flying to Panama. The Constellation fleet was upgraded to L-1049G Super Constellations. An order for the first jet airliner, the De Havilland Comet 1, was placed, but with the Comet crashes of the 1950s, the airline never got their Comet jets. On March 24, 1956, LAV introduced its first turboprop, a Vickers Viscount 701 which was to replace the older piston engined Douglas and Martin aircraft.

In the early 1960s, the Venezuelan government wanted to separate LAV's international and domestic routes, thus creating a new airline, Viasa, for international flights. A new livery was introduced for the new decade. The full airline title which had appeared on the Constellation fleet was simplified to a simple and bold AEROPOSTAL. The Constellations flew with a flying globe logo on the nose, was also simplified, now appearing on the fin as a flying bird logo, a logo that would remain with the airline. Also in the early 1960s, the 'jet-prop' Avro 748 was introduced to replace the smaller piston twins that had made up LAV's fleet since 1938. Douglas DC-8 jets were introduced in 1961 to replace the Super Constellations.

During the 1960s and 1990s LAV continued to introduce new fleet types like first the Caravelle and then McDonnell Douglas DC-9 and the MD-80

During the late 1980s, Aeropostal substituted Viasa with a run from Caracas to Luis Muñoz Marín International Airport in San Juan, Puerto Rico, where the airline also sponsored WAPA-TV's weekly, youth oriented Control Remoto television show.

Recent history
In August 1994, commercial operations ceased, as part of a government effort to trim expenses. In 1996, Corporacion Alas de Venezuela (CAV), a private company owned by Nelson Ramiz, a Cuban-born US citizen and his Venezuelan wife, Haydhelm Emilia Valesquez Morales, bought the assets from the liquidator, at an auction in Caracas on September 27, 1997, in a transaction that led to litigation in New York and Caracas. The purchase was funded by an investment company Alas International Limited ("Alas"). Instead of delivering the purchased assets to Alas, as required by the funding agreement, CAV restarted airline operations on January 7, 1998, using the purchased assets without permission from Alas. Alas launched a series of lawsuits against Ramiz, Valesquez, CAV and Aeropostal and on November 2, 1998, the US Supreme Court of New York found in favor of Alas, a judgement later confirmed on appeal. The essence of the judgement was that neither Ramiz, Morales, CAV or the airline had any economic or legal interest in the various assets purchased in 1997, including the aircraft and the trade name "Aeropostal". As a result, CAV, the airline and Ramiz entered into a settlement agreement on February 29, 2000, filed and entered at the New York Supreme Court with Index No. 601817/97 under which title of the aircraft transferred to the Alas owners but Alas allowed the airline to continue flying the aircraft in return for various payments. CAV and Aeropostal subsequently defaulted on the settlement and further litigation followed in the Supreme Court of the State of New York under case reference 652688/2012, as a result of which, CAV and Aeropostal owe the successors to Alas very significant damages.

As of March 2007, Aeropostal had 2,319 employees.

Flights to the United States began in July 1998 and to Madrid in November 2001, although the latter have since ceased. In the late 1990s, Aeropostal introduced two leased Irish-registered Airbus A320-200s to fly alongside the fleet of DC-9, McDonnell Douglas MD-83 and Boeing 727-200 jets. At the end of 2007, Nelson Ramiz (then CEO) reduced the fleet of 22 to only 3 claiming that the currency controls imposed by the Venezuelan government prevented him from maintaining the fleet, and that fare controls kept Aeropostal from making a profit. During that period, the Venezuelan Government planned on shutting down the airline if major changes were not planned.

The National Institute of Civil Aviation temporarily grounded Aeropostal operations, leaving thousands of passengers stranded in the high-travel holiday season.

As of 2008, it was reported that the airline was sold to a group led by the Mahkled family from the state of Carabobo, Venezuela. The Makled family were later arrested by the Venezuelan government on money laundering and drug running charges but this transaction has been challenged as ineffective as neither Ramiz nor his wife had the power to transfer the shares as these were pledged to Alas under the settlement agreement referred to above. In 2009, the Venezuelan government announced its intention to nationalise Aeropostal, following the arrest of several owners and employees in 2008 on Interpol drug trafficking warrants.

On February 25, 2011, Aeropostal's Special Managing Board officially announced the retirement of YV141T, the last DC-9-30 in its fleet. The final commercial flight was done on March 10, 2011. Although the -30s Series has been retired, the DC-9-50s would continue flying for Aeropostal, and according to LAV there where no plans for their retirement in the next 3 years.

On September 24, 2017, Aerospostal ceased operations. The Board of Directors announced the retirement of operations of the airline, due to financial and economical problems. On August 8, 2018, the company informed to continue flights again, along with the opening of a route to Havana from Caracas with three weekly frequencies.

Destinations

As of August 2022, Aeropostal operates to be the following destinations:

Fleet

Current fleet

, the Aeropostal fleet consisted of the following aircraft:

In addition, Aeropostal uses a McDonnell Douglas DC-9-50 as a crew training aircraft.

Retired fleet

Aeropostal had in the past operated the following aircraft:

Accidents and incidents
Aeropostal has had a total of 24 accidents and incidents since April 23, 1937 with a total of 319 fatalities. The worst accident for Aeropostal (and the worst scheduled-airline accident in history until then) was on June 20, 1956, when 74 people were killed when a Lockheed Constellation, registration YV-C-AMS, crashed into the Atlantic Ocean off the coast of New York.

On November 27, 1956, Linea Aeropostal Venezolana Flight 253, crashed while on approach to Caracas International Airport. All 25 passengers and crew on board were killed.
On January 25, 1971, Vickers Viscount (registered YV-C-AMV) crashed into a mountain near Mérida. Thirteen of the 47 people on board were killed.
On November 1, 1971, Vickers Viscount (registered YV-C-AMZ) crashed shortly after take-off from La Chinita International Airport, Maracaibo. All four people on board were killed.
On August 27, 1972, Douglas C-47 (registered YV-C-AKE) suffered a failure of the port engine shortly after take-off from Canaima Airport on a domestic scheduled passenger flight to Tomás de Heres Airport, Ciudad Bolivar. The aircraft crashed whilst attempting to return to Canaima, killing all 34 people on board.
On August 14, 1974, Vickers Viscount (registered YV-C-AMX) flew into La Gloria, Isla Margarita due to rains caused by Tropical Storm Alma killing all 49 people on board.
On March 3, 1978, a Hawker Siddeley HS 748 (registered YV-45C) crashed into the sea close to Punta Mulatos after an instrument problem. All 47 on boards were killed.
On July 29, 1984, Aeropostal Flight 252 from Caracas to Curaçao, two gunmen, one Haitian and one of Dominican nationality, hijacked the plane with 79 people on board. The hijackers demanded money, weapons, and a helicopter to remove five children from the aircraft, and also threatened to blow up the plane if stormed. The plane was stormed by Venezuelan commandos of the DISIP, both hijackers were killed, and all hostages were released, ending the 36-hour-long crisis.
On March 5, 1991, Aeropostal Alas de Venezuela Flight 108 from Maracaibo to Santa Bárbara del Zulia crashed into a hillside after takeoff. All 45 on board were killed.
On March 6, 2008, a McDonnell Douglas MD-82 (registered N905TA), which was carrying out flight VH501 from Miami to Caracas, was forced to land at the Arturo Michelena International Airport in Valencia due to the suspicion of a hydraulic leak on the right side of the aircraft.
On September 26, 2011, a McDonnell Douglas DC-9-51 (registered YV136T) made a hard touch down at Puerto Ordaz causing both engines' (JT8D) pylons and support structures at the airframe to crack and distort nearly separating the engines from the airframe. The airplane slowed safely, stopped on the runway and was shut down. No injuries occurred, the aircraft received substantial damage. The passengers disembarked onto the runway.

Inflight magazine
Pasajero ("Passenger") is Aeropostal's in-flight magazine published by Playalens, Inc., a Hispanic-owned Miami-based publishing company. It is publishing six times a year with a circulation of 20,000 copies distributed in all domestic and international Aeropostal flights.

See also
List of airlines of Venezuela

References

External links

Aeropostal official website
Aeropostal Alas de Venezuela Fleet

 
Airlines of Venezuela
Latin American and Caribbean Air Transport Association
Airlines established in 1929
1929 establishments in Venezuela